John Lemuel Bethune (March 9, 1850 – September 27, 1913) was a Canadian physician and politician in the province of Nova Scotia.

Born in Loch Lomond, Nova Scotia, the son of Roderick and Mary B. Bethune, Bethune received his Doctor of Medicine degree from Dalhousie College in 1875. From 1886 to 1896, he was the Nova Scotia Conservative member of the Nova Scotia House of Assembly for the electoral district of Victoria County. He was elected to the House of Commons of Canada for the electoral district of Victoria in the 1896 federal election. A Conservative, he did not run in 1900. In 1881, he was a captain and paymaster for the 94th Battalion, Argyle Highlanders Volunteer Militia. In 1893, he was promoted to Lieutenant-Colonel.

References
 
 

1850 births
1913 deaths
Dalhousie University alumni
Conservative Party of Canada (1867–1942) MPs
Members of the House of Commons of Canada from Nova Scotia
Progressive Conservative Association of Nova Scotia MLAs